Giancarlo Martini (16 August 1947 – 26 March 2013) was a racing driver from Italy. He participated in two non-championship Formula One Grands Prix driving a Ferrari 312T for Giancarlo Minardi. He was the uncle of the racing drivers Pierluigi Martini and Oliver Martini.


Racing record

Complete European Formula Two Championship results
(key) (Races in bold indicate pole position; races in italics indicate fastest lap)

Complete Formula One results
(Note: races in bold denote pole position.)

Non-championship results

References
Formula 2 Register

1947 births
2013 deaths
Sportspeople from the Province of Ravenna
Italian racing drivers
Italian Formula One drivers
European Formula Two Championship drivers
British Formula One Championship drivers